This is a complete list of Scottish Statutory Instruments in 2013.

1-100 

 The National Library of Scotland Act 2012 (Commencement) Order 2013 (S.S.I. 2013 No. 1 (C. 1))
 The Judicial Pensions and Retirement Act 1993 (Scottish Land Court) Order 2013 (S.S.I. 2013 No. 2)
 The Bovine Viral Diarrhoea (Scotland) Order 2013 (S.S.I. 2013 No. 3)
 The Sports Grounds and Sporting Events (Designation) (Scotland) Amendment Order 2013 (S.S.I. 2013 No. 4)
 The Plant Health (Scotland) Amendment Order 2013 (S.S.I. 2013 No. 5)
 The Restriction of Liberty Order etc. (Scotland) Regulations 2013 (S.S.I. 2013 No. 6)
 The Housing (Scotland) Act 2001 (Assistance to Registered Social Landlords and Other Persons) (Grants) Amendment Regulations 2013 (S.S.I. 2013 No. 7)
 The Scottish Road Works Register (Prescribed Fees) Regulations 2013 (S.S.I. 2013 No. 8)
 The Less Favoured Area Support Scheme (Scotland) Amendment Regulations 2013 (S.S.I. 2013 No. 9)
 The A828 Trunk Road (Duror Village Cycle Track) (Redetermination of Means of Exercise of Public Right of Passage) Order 2013 (S.S.I. 2013 No. 10)
 The A90 Trunk Road (Crimond) (30 mph Speed Limit) Order 2013 (S.S.I. 2013 No. 11)
 The Energy Performance of Buildings (Scotland) Amendment Regulations 2013 (S.S.I. 2013 No. 12)
 The A85 (Main Street, Methven) (Temporary Prohibition of Waiting, Loading and Unloading) Order 2013 (S.S.I. 2013 No. 13)
 The Looked After Children (Scotland) Amendment Regulations 2013 (S.S.I. 2013 No. 14)
 The North West Scotland Trunk Roads (Temporary Prohibitions of Traffic and Overtaking and Temporary Speed Restrictions) (No.1) Order 2013 (S.S.I. 2013 No. 15)
 The South West Scotland Trunk Roads (Temporary Prohibitions of Traffic and Overtaking and Temporary Speed Restrictions) (No. 1) Order 2013 (S.S.I. 2013 No. 16)
 The South East Scotland Trunk Roads (Temporary Prohibitions of Traffic and Overtaking and Temporary Speed Restrictions) (No. 1) Order 2013 (S.S.I. 2013 No. 17)
 The North East Scotland Trunk Roads (Temporary Prohibitions of Traffic and Overtaking and Temporary Speed Restrictions) (No. 1) Order 2013 (S.S.I. 2013 No. 18)
 The Private Rented Housing (Scotland) Act 2011 (Commencement No. 5 and Transitional Provision) Order 2013 (S.S.I. 2013 No. 19 (C. 2))
 The Tenant Information Packs (Assured Tenancies) (Scotland) Order 2013 (S.S.I. 2013 No. 20)
 The Bovine Viral Diarrhoea (Scotland) Amendment Order 2013 (S.S.I. 2013 No. 21)
 The Knife Dealers (Licence Conditions) (Scotland) Order 2013 (S.S.I. 2013 No. 22)
 Act of Sederunt (Messengers-at-Arms and Sheriff Officers Rules) (Amendment) 2013 (S.S.I. 2013 No. 23)
 The Public Services Reform (Planning) (Local Review Procedure) (Scotland) Order 2013 (S.S.I. 2013 No. 24)
 The Public Services Reform (Planning) (Pre-application consultation) (Scotland) Order 2013 (S.S.I. 2013 No. 25)
 The Planning etc. (Scotland) Act 2006 (Supplementary and Consequential Provisions) Order 2013 (S.S.I. 2013 No. 26)
 The A9 Trunk Road (Kessock Bridge) (Temporary Prohibition of Specified Turns and Use of Specified Lanes) Order 2013 (S.S.I. 2013 No. 27)
 The A9 and A82 Trunk Roads (Kessock Bridge) (Temporary Prohibitions on Use and Speed Limits) Order 2013 (S.S.I. 2013 No. 28)
 The Water Environment (Drinking Water Protected Areas) (Scotland) Order 2013 (S.S.I. 2013 No. 29)
 The A82 Trunk Road (Aberchalder Bridge) (Temporary Prohibition of Traffic) Order 2013 (S.S.I. 2013 No. 30)
 The Wildlife and Countryside Act 1981 (Variation of Schedules A1 and 1A) (Scotland) Order 2013 (S.S.I. 2013 No. 31)
 The Non-Domestic Rates (Levying) (Scotland) Amendment Regulations 2013 (S.S.I. 2013 No. 34)
 The Police Service of Scotland Regulations 2013 (S.S.I. 2013 No. 35)
 The Non-Domestic Rating (Valuation of Utilities) (Scotland) Amendment Order 2013 (S.S.I. 2013 No. 36)
 The Non-Domestic Rating (Unoccupied Property) (Scotland) Amendment Regulations 2013 (S.S.I. 2013 No. 37)
 The Tobacco and Primary Medical Services (Scotland) Act 2010 (Commencement No. 3) Order 2013 (S.S.I. 2013 No. 38 (C. 3))
 The Police Service of Scotland (Promotion) Regulations 2013 (S.S.I. 2013 No. 39)
 The National Assistance (Sums for Personal Requirements) (Scotland) Regulations 2013 (S.S.I. 2013 No. 40)
 The National Assistance (Assessment of Resources) Amendment (Scotland) Regulations 2013 (S.S.I. 2013 No. 41)
 The Police Service of Scotland (Police Cadets) Regulations 2013 (S.S.I. 2013 No. 42)
 The Police Service of Scotland (Special Constables) Regulations 2013 (S.S.I. 2013 No. 43)
 The Local Government Finance (Scotland) Order 2013 (S.S.I. 2013 No. 44)
 The Council Tax (Variation for Unoccupied Dwellings) (Scotland) Regulations 2013 (S.S.I. 2013 No. 45)
 The Caledonian Maritime Assets (Lochaline Ferry Services Slipway) Harbour Empowerment Order 2013 (S.S.I. 2013 No. 46)
 The Police and Fire Reform (Scotland) Act 2012 (Commencement No. 3 and Transitory Provision) Order 2013 (S.S.I. 2013 No. 47 (C. 4))
 The Council Tax Reduction (Scotland) Amendment Regulations 2013 (S.S.I. 2013 No. 48)
 The Council Tax Reduction (State Pension Credit) (Scotland) Amendment Regulations 2013 (S.S.I. 2013 No. 49)
 The Rehabilitation of Offenders Act 1974 (Exclusions and Exceptions) (Scotland) Order 2013 (S.S.I. 2013 No. 50)
 The Police and Fire Reform (Scotland) Act 2012 (Commencement No. 4, Transitory and Transitional Provisions) Order 2013 (S.S.I. 2013 No. 51 (C. 5))
 The National Health Service (Scotland) (Injury Benefits) Amendment Regulations 2013 (S.S.I. 2013 No. 52)
 The Personal Injuries (NHS Charges) (Amounts) (Scotland) Amendment Regulations 2013 (S.S.I. 2013 No. 53)
 The North East Scotland Trunk Roads (Temporary Prohibitions of Traffic and Overtaking and Temporary Speed Restrictions) (No. 2) Order 2013 (S.S.I. 2013 No. 54)
 The North West Scotland Trunk Roads (Temporary Prohibitions of Traffic and Overtaking and Temporary Speed Restrictions) (No.2) Order 2013 (S.S.I. 2013 No. 55)
 The South East Scotland Trunk Roads (Temporary Prohibitions of Traffic and Overtaking and Temporary Speed Restrictions) (No. 2) Order 2013 (S.S.I. 2013 No. 56)
 The South West Scotland Trunk Roads (Temporary Prohibitions of Traffic and Overtaking and Temporary Speed Restrictions) (No. 2) Order 2013 (S.S.I. 2013 No. 57)
 The Electricity (Applications for Consent) Amendment (Scotland) Regulations 2013 (S.S.I. 2013 No. 58)
 The Fees in the Registers of Scotland (Consequential Provisions) Amendment Order 2013 (S.S.I. 2013 No. 59)
 The Police Service of Scotland (Conduct) Regulations 2013 (S.S.I. 2013 No. 60)
 The Police Service of Scotland (Performance) Regulations 2013 (S.S.I. 2013 No. 61)
 The Police Service of Scotland (Senior Officers) (Conduct) Regulations 2013 (S.S.I. 2013 No. 62)
 The Police Appeals Tribunals (Scotland) Rules 2013 (S.S.I. 2013 No. 63)
 The Education (School Lunches) (Scotland) Amendment Regulations 2013 (S.S.I. 2013 No. 64)
 The Welfare Reform (Consequential Amendments) (Scotland) Regulations 2013 (S.S.I. 2013 No. 65)
 The A977 Trunk Road (Feregait and Toll Road, Kincardine) (Temporary Prohibition of Waiting, Loading and Unloading) Order 2013 (S.S.I. 2013 No. 66)
 The Road Traffic (Permitted Parking Area and Special Parking Area) (East Renfrewshire Council) Designation Order 2013 (S.S.I. 2013 No. 67)
 The Road Traffic (Parking Adjudicators) (East Renfrewshire Council) Regulations 2013 (S.S.I. 2013 No. 68)
 The Parking Attendants (Wearing of Uniforms) (East Renfrewshire Council Parking Area) Regulations 2013 (S.S.I. 2013 No. 69)
 The National Health Service (Superannuation Scheme and Pension Scheme) (Scotland) Amendment Regulations 2013 (S.S.I. 2013 No. 70)
 The Teachers’ Superannuation (Scotland) Amendment Regulations 2013 (S.S.I. 2013 No. 71)
 Act of Adjournal (Criminal Procedure Rules Amendment) (Miscellaneous) 2013 (S.S.I. 2013 No. 72)
 The Scottish Police Authority (Provision of Goods and Services) Order 2013 (S.S.I. 2013 No. 73)
 The Financial Assistance for Environmental Purposes (Scotland) Order 2013 (S.S.I. 2013 No. 74)
 The Individual Learning Account (Scotland) Amendment Regulations 2013 (S.S.I. 2013 No. 75)
 The Police Service of Scotland (Temporary Service) Regulations 2013 (S.S.I. 2013 No. 76)
 The Late Payment of Commercial Debts (Scotland) Regulations 2013 (S.S.I. 2013 No. 77)
 The Non-Domestic Rates (Enterprise Areas) (Scotland) Amendment Regulations 2013 (S.S.I. 2013 No. 78)
 The Public Transport Users’ Committee for Scotland (Removal of Functions) Order 2013 (S.S.I. 2013 No. 79)
 The Education (Fees, Awards and Student Support) (Miscellaneous Amendments) (Scotland) Regulations 2013 (S.S.I. 2013 No. 80)
 Act of Sederunt (Rules of the Court of Session Amendment) (Protective Expenses Orders in Environmental Appeals and Judicial Reviews) 2013 (S.S.I. 2013 No. 81)
 The Private Rented Housing (Scotland) Act 2011 (Commencement No. 6 and Savings Provisions) Order 2013 (S.S.I. 2013 No. 82 (C. 6))
 The Food (Miscellaneous Amendment and Revocation) (Scotland) Regulations 2013 (S.S.I. 2013 No. 83)
 The Food Safety (Sampling and Qualifications) (Scotland) Regulations 2013 (S.S.I. 2013 No. 84)
 The Sale of Tobacco (Display of Tobacco Products and Prices etc.) (Scotland) Regulations 2013 (S.S.I. 2013 No. 85)
 The Police Federation (Scotland) Regulations 2013 (S.S.I. 2013 No. 86)
 The Council Tax (Information-sharing in relation to Council Tax Reduction) (Scotland) Regulations 2013 (S.S.I. 2013 No. 87)
 The A9 Trunk Road (Golspie) (Prohibition of Waiting) Order 2013 (S.S.I. 2013 No. 88)
 The Police Pensions (Contributions) Amendment (Scotland) Regulations 2013 (S.S.I. 2013 No. 89)
 The Tenant Information Packs (Assured Tenancies) (Scotland) Amendment Order 2013 (S.S.I. 2013 No. 90)
 Act of Sederunt (Sheriff Court Rules) (Lay Representation) 2013 (S.S.I. 2013 No. 91)
 The Criminal Legal Aid (Fixed Payments) (Scotland) Amendment Regulations 2013 (S.S.I. 2013 No. 92)
 The Road Traffic (Permitted Parking Area and Special Parking Area) (Fife Council) Designation Order 2013 (S.S.I. 2013 No. 93)
 The Parking Attendants (Wearing of Uniforms) (Fife Council Parking Area) Regulations 2013 (S.S.I. 2013 No. 94)
 The Road Traffic (Parking Adjudicators) (Fife Council) Regulations 2013 (S.S.I. 2013 No. 95)
 The National Health Service (Optical Charges and Payments) (Scotland) Amendment Regulations 2013 (S.S.I. 2013 No. 96)
 The Scottish Fire and Rescue Service (Framework and Appointed Day for Strategic Plan) Order 2013 (S.S.I. 2013 No. 97)
 The Children's Hearings (Scotland) Act 2011 (Commencement No. 7) Order 2013 (S.S.I. 2013 No. 98 (C. 7))
 The Children's Hearings (Scotland) Act 2011 (Transfer of Children to Scotland – Effect of Orders made in England and Wales or Northern Ireland) Regulations 2013 (S.S.I. 2013 No. 99)
 The Title Conditions (Scotland) Act 2003 (Rural Housing Bodies) Amendment Order 2013 (S.S.I. 2013 No. 100)

101-200 

 The South West Scotland Trunk Roads (Temporary Prohibitions of Traffic and Overtaking and Temporary Speed Restrictions) (No. 3) Order 2013 (S.S.I. 2013 No. 101)
 The North West Scotland Trunk Roads (Temporary Prohibitions of Traffic and Overtaking and Temporary Speed Restrictions) (No. 3) Order 2013 (S.S.I. 2013 No. 102)
 The North East Scotland Trunk Roads (Temporary Prohibitions of Traffic and Overtaking and Temporary Speed Restrictions) (No. 3) Order 2013 (S.S.I. 2013 No. 103)
 The South East Scotland Trunk Roads (Temporary Prohibitions of Traffic and Overtaking and Temporary Speed Restrictions) (No. 3) Order 2013 (S.S.I. 2013 No. 104)
 The Town and Country Planning (Fees for Applications and Deemed Applications) (Scotland) Amendment Regulations 2013 (S.S.I. 2013 No. 105)
 The Tobacco and Primary Medical Services (Scotland) Act 2010 (Incidental Provision and Commencement No. 4) Order 2013 (S.S.I. 2013 No. 106 (C. 8))
 The Local Government Finance (Scotland) Amendment Order 2013 (S.S.I. 2013 No. 107)
 The Community Care (Personal Care and Nursing Care) (Scotland) Amendment Regulations 2013 (S.S.I. 2013 No. 108)
 The National Health Service Superannuation Scheme etc. (Miscellaneous Amendments) (Scotland) Regulations 2013 (S.S.I. 2013 No. 109)
 The Social Care and Social Work Improvement Scotland (Requirements for Care Services) Amendment Regulations 2013 (S.S.I. 2013 No. 110)
 Act of Sederunt (Rules of the Court of Session Amendment No. 2) (Fees of Shorthand Writers) 2013 (S.S.I. 2013 No. 111)
 Act of Sederunt (Fees of Shorthand Writers in the Sheriff Court) (Amendment) 2013 (S.S.I. 2013 No. 112)
 The Valuation (Postponement of Revaluation) (Scotland) Order 2013 (S.S.I. 2013 No. 113)
 The National Bus Travel Concession Scheme for Older and Disabled Persons (Scotland) Amendment Order 2013 (S.S.I. 2013 No. 114)
 The Aberdeen City (Electoral Arrangements) Variation Order 2013 (S.S.I. 2013 No. 115)
 The Renewables Obligation (Scotland) Amendment Order 2013 (S.S.I. 2013 No. 116)
 The Budget (Scotland) Act 2012 Amendment Order 2013 (S.S.I. 2013 No. 117)
 The Police Investigations and Review Commissioner (Investigations Procedure, Serious Incidents and Specified Weapons) Regulations 2013 (S.S.I. 2013 No. 118)
 The Police and Fire Reform (Scotland) Act 2012 (Consequential Modifications and Savings) Order 2013 (S.S.I. 2013 No. 119)
 Act of Sederunt (Rules of the Court of Session Amendment No. 3) (Miscellaneous) 2013 (S.S.I. 2013 No. 120)
 The Police and Fire Reform (Scotland) Act 2012 (Supplementary, Transitional, Transitory and Saving Provisions) Order 2013 (S.S.I. 2013 No. 121)
 The Police Service of Scotland (Amendment) Regulations 2013 (S.S.I. 2013 No. 122)
 The Action Programme for Nitrate Vulnerable Zones (Scotland) Amendment Regulations 2013 (S.S.I. 2013 No. 123)
 The Scottish Civil Justice Council and Criminal Legal Assistance Act 2013 (Commencement No. 1, Transitional and Transitory Provisions) Order 2013 (S.S.I. 2013 No. 124 (C. 9))
 The Police Service of Scotland (Amendment) (No. 2) Regulations 2013 (S.S.I. 2013 No. 125)
 The Freedom of Information (Scotland) Act 2002 (Scottish Public Authorities) Amendment Order 2013 (S.S.I. 2013 No. 126)
 The Environmental Information (Scotland) Amendment Regulations 2013 (S.S.I. 2013 No. 127)
 The Firemen's Pension Scheme (Amendment) (Scotland) Order 2013 (S.S.I. 2013 No. 128)
 The Firefighters’ Pension Scheme (Scotland) Amendment Order 2013 (S.S.I. 2013 No. 129)
 The South West Scotland Trunk Roads (Temporary Prohibitions of Traffic and Overtaking and Temporary Speed Restrictions) (No. 4) Order 2013 (S.S.I. 2013 No. 130)
 The Late Payment of Commercial Debts (Scotland) (No. 2) Regulations 2013 (S.S.I. 2013 No. 131)
 The South East Scotland Trunk Roads (Temporary Prohibitions of Traffic and Overtaking and Temporary Speed Restrictions) (No. 4) Order 2013 (S.S.I. 2013 No. 132)
 The North West Scotland Trunk Roads (Temporary Prohibitions of Traffic and Overtaking and Temporary Speed Restrictions) (No. 4) Order 2013 (S.S.I. 2013 No. 133)
 The North East Scotland Trunk Roads (Temporary Prohibitions of Traffic and Overtaking and Temporary Speed Restrictions) (No. 4) Order 2013 (S.S.I. 2013 No. 134)
 Act of Sederunt (Sheriff Court Rules) (Miscellaneous Amendments) 2013 (S.S.I. 2013 No. 135)
 The Freedom of Information (Amendment) (Scotland) Act 2013 (Commencement and Transitional Provision) Order 2013 (S.S.I. 2013 No. 136 (C. 10))
 The Welfare Reform (Consequential Amendments) (Scotland) (No. 2) Regulations 2013 (S.S.I. 2013 No. 137)
 The A82 Trunk Road (Pulpit Rock Improvement) (Temporary Prohibition of Traffic and Overtaking and Speed Restriction) Order 2013 (S.S.I. 2013 No. 138)
 Act of Sederunt (Sheriff Court Rules) (Miscellaneous Amendments) (No. 2) 2013 (S.S.I. 2013 No. 139)
 The A82 Trunk Road (Belford Road/Inverlochy Place, Fort William) (Temporary Prohibition on Waiting, Loading and Unloading) Order 2013 (S.S.I. 2013 No. 140)
 The Regulation of Care (Social Service Workers) (Scotland) Amendment Order 2013 (S.S.I. 2013 No. 141)
 The Welfare Reform (Consequential Amendments) (Scotland) (No. 3) Regulations 2013 (S.S.I. 2013 No. 142)
 The Building (Miscellaneous Amendments) (Scotland) Regulations 2013 (S.S.I. 2013 No. 143)
 The Children's Legal Assistance (Fees) (Miscellaneous Amendments) (Scotland) Regulations 2013 (S.S.I. 2013 No. 144)
 The M90/A90 Trunk Road (Charlestown to Damhead) (Temporary Prohibition of Specified Turns) Order 2013 (S.S.I. 2013 No. 145)
 The Children's Hearings (Scotland) Act 2011 (Rehabilitation of Offenders) (Transitory Provisions) Order 2013 (S.S.I. 2013 No. 146)
 The Children's Hearings (Scotland) Act 2011 (Modification of Subordinate Legislation) Order 2013 (S.S.I. 2013 No. 147)
 The Home Energy Assistance Scheme (Scotland) Regulations 2013 (S.S.I. 2013 No. 148)
 The Children's Hearings (Scotland) Act 2011 (Compulsory Supervision Orders etc.: Further Provision) Regulations 2013 (S.S.I. 2013 No. 149)
 The Children's Hearings (Scotland) Act 2011 (Transitional, Savings and Supplementary Provisions) Order 2013 (S.S.I. 2013 No. 150)
 The Animal Health (Miscellaneous Fees and Amendments) (Scotland) Regulations 2013 (S.S.I. 2013 No. 151)
 The Sheriff Court Districts Amendment Order 2013 (S.S.I. 2013 No. 152)
 The Justice of the Peace Courts (Scotland) Amendment Order 2013 (S.S.I. 2013 No. 153)
 The Town and Country Planning (Control of Advertisements) (Scotland) Amendment Regulations 2013 (S.S.I. 2013 No. 154)
 The Town and Country Planning (Development Management Procedure) (Scotland) Regulations 2013 (S.S.I. 2013 No. 155)
 The Town and Country Planning (Appeals) (Scotland) Regulations 2013 (S.S.I. 2013 No. 156)
 The Town and Country Planning (Schemes of Delegation and Local Review Procedure) (Scotland) Regulations 2013 (S.S.I. 2013 No. 157)
 The North East Scotland Trunk Roads (Temporary Prohibitions of Traffic and Overtaking and Temporary Speed Restrictions) (No. 5) Order 2013 (S.S.I. 2013 No. 158)
 The Certification of Death (Scotland) Act 2011 (Commencement No. 1) Order 2013 (S.S.I. 2013 No. 159 (C. 11))
 The Glasgow Commonwealth Games (Compensation for Enforcement Action) (Scotland) Regulations 2013 (S.S.I. 2013 No. 160)
 Act of Sederunt (Lands Valuation Appeal Court) 2013 (S.S.I. 2013 No. 161)
 Act of Sederunt (Rules of the Court of Session Amendment No. 4) (Miscellaneous) 2013 (S.S.I. 2013 No. 162)
 The Water Resources (Scotland) Act 2013 (Commencement No. 1) Order 2013 (S.S.I. 2013 No. 163 (C. 12))
 The North West Scotland Trunk Roads (Temporary Prohibitions of Traffic and Overtaking and Temporary Speed Restrictions) (No. 5) Order 2013 (S.S.I. 2013 No. 164)
 The South East Scotland Trunk Roads (Temporary Prohibitions of Traffic and Overtaking and Temporary Speed Restrictions) (No. 5) Order 2013 (S.S.I. 2013 No. 165)
 The South West Scotland Trunk Roads (Temporary Prohibitions of Traffic and Overtaking and Temporary Speed Restrictions) (No. 5) Order 2013 (S.S.I. 2013 No. 166)
 The M898/A898 Trunk Road (Erskine Bridge) (Temporary Prohibition of Traffic and 40 mph Speed Restriction) Order 2013 (S.S.I. 2013 No. 167)
 The National Health Service (Superannuation Scheme and Pension Scheme) (Scotland) Amendment (No. 2) Regulations 2013 (S.S.I. 2013 No. 168)
 The National Library of Scotland Act 2012 (Consequential Modifications) Order 2013 (S.S.I. 2013 No. 169)
 The Equality Act 2010 (Specification of Public Authorities) (Scotland) Order 2013 (S.S.I. 2013 No. 170)
 Act of Sederunt (Sheriff Court Rules) (Miscellaneous Amendments) (No. 3) 2013 (S.S.I. 2013 No. 171)
 Act of Sederunt (Children's Hearings (Scotland) Act 2011) (Miscellaneous Amendments) 2013 (S.S.I. 2013 No. 172)
 The Animal Health (Miscellaneous Amendments) (Scotland) Order 2013 (S.S.I. 2013 No. 173)
 The National Health Service Superannuation Scheme (2008 Section) (Scotland) Regulations 2013 (S.S.I. 2013 No. 174)
 The Requirements for Community Learning and Development (Scotland) Regulations 2013 (S.S.I. 2013 No. 175)
 The Water Environment (Controlled Activities) (Scotland) Amendment Regulations 2013 (S.S.I. 2013 No. 176)
 The European Union (Amendments in respect of the Accession of Croatia) (Scotland) Regulations 2013 (S.S.I. 2013 No. 177)
 The Dangerous Dogs (Fees) (Scotland) Order 2013 (S.S.I. 2013 No. 178)
 The Adam Smith College, Fife (Transfer and Closure) Order 2013 (S.S.I. 2013 No. 179)
 The Anniesland College and Langside College (Transfer and Closure) (Scotland) Order 2013 (S.S.I. 2013 No. 180)
 The James Watt College (Transfer and Closure) (Scotland) Order 2013 (S.S.I. 2013 No. 181)
 The Kilmarnock College (Transfer and Closure) (Scotland) Order 2013 (S.S.I. 2013 No. 182)
 The Reid Kerr College (Transfer and Closure) (Scotland) Order 2013 (S.S.I. 2013 No. 183)
 The Police Reform (Pensions Amendments) (Scotland) Regulations 2013 (S.S.I. 2013 No. 184)
 The Firemen's Pension Scheme (Amendment) (Scotland) (No. 2) Order 2013 (S.S.I. 2013 No. 185)
 The Fire Reform (Pensions Amendments) (Scotland) Order 2013 (S.S.I. 2013 No. 186)
 The Plant Health (Scotland) Amendment (No. 2) Order 2013 (S.S.I. 2013 No. 187)
 The Mobile Homes (Written Statement) (Scotland) Regulations 2013 (S.S.I. 2013 No. 188)
 The Sea Fishing (Illegal, unreported and unregulated fishing) (Scotland) Order 2013 (S.S.I. 2013 No. 189)
 The Children's Hearings (Scotland) Act 2011 (Commencement No. 8) Order 2013 (S.S.I. 2013 No. 190 (C. 13))
 The National Health Service (Free Prescriptions and Charges for Drugs and Appliances) (Scotland) Amendment Regulations 2013 (S.S.I. 2013 No. 191)
 The Public Services Reform (Scotland) Act 2010 Modification Order 2013 (S.S.I. 2013 No. 192)
 The Children's Hearings (Scotland) Act 2011 (Review of Contact Directions and Definition of Relevant Person) Order 2013 (S.S.I. 2013 No. 193)
 The Children's Hearings (Scotland) Act 2011 (Rules of Procedure in Children's Hearings) Rules 2013 (S.S.I. 2013 No. 194)
 The Children's Hearings (Scotland) Act 2011 (Commencement No. 9) Order 2013 (S.S.I. 2013 No. 195 (C. 14))
 Act of Adjournal (Criminal Procedure Rules Amendment No. 2) (Sexual Offences Act 2003) (Notification Requirements) 2013 (S.S.I. 2013 No. 196)
 The Public Services Reform (Commissioner for Ethical Standards in Public Life in Scotland etc.) Order 2013 (S.S.I. 2013 No. 197)
 Act of Adjournal (Criminal Procedure Rules Amendment No. 3) (Miscellaneous) 2013 (S.S.I. 2013 No. 198)
 The Sale of Alcohol to Children and Young Persons (Scotland) Amendment Regulations 2013 (S.S.I. 2013 No. 199)
 The Children's Legal Assistance (Scotland) Regulations 2013 (S.S.I. 2013 No. 200)

201-300 

 The Public Health etc. (Scotland) Act 2008 (Sunbed) Amendment Regulations 2013 (S.S.I. 2013 No. 201)
 The Sale of Tobacco (Prescribed Documents) (Scotland) Regulations 2013 (S.S.I. 2013 No. 202)
 The Protection of Vulnerable Groups (Scotland) Act 2007 (Modification of Regulated Work with Children) (Children's Hearings) Order 2013 (S.S.I. 2013 No. 203)
 The Rehabilitation of Offenders Act 1974 (Exclusions and Exceptions) (Scotland) Amendment Order 2013 (S.S.I. 2013 No. 204)
 The Secure Accommodation (Scotland) Regulations 2013 (S.S.I. 2013 No. 205)
 The South West Scotland Trunk Roads (Temporary Prohibitions of Traffic and Overtaking and Temporary Speed Restrictions) (No. 6) Order 2013 (S.S.I. 2013 No. 206)
 The M8 Motorway (Junction 21, Seaward Street) (Width Restriction) Order 2013 (S.S.I. 2013 No. 207)
 The South East Scotland Trunk Roads (Temporary Prohibitions of Traffic and Overtaking and Temporary Speed Restrictions) (No. 6) Order 2013 (S.S.I. 2013 No. 208)
 The North East Scotland Trunk Roads (Temporary Prohibitions of Traffic and Overtaking and Temporary Speed Restrictions) (No. 6) Order 2013 (S.S.I. 2013 No. 209)
 The Children's Hearings (Scotland) Act 2011 (Movement Restriction Conditions) Regulations 2013 (S.S.I. 2013 No. 210)
 The Children's Hearings (Scotland) Act 2011 (Modification of Primary Legislation) Order 2013 (S.S.I. 2013 No. 211)
 The Children's Hearings (Scotland) Act 2011 (Implementation of Secure Accommodation Authorisation) (Scotland) Regulations 2013 (S.S.I. 2013 No. 212)
 The North West Scotland Trunk Roads (Temporary Prohibitions of Traffic and Overtaking and Temporary Speed Restrictions) (No. 6) Order 2013 (S.S.I. 2013 No. 213)
 The Criminal Justice and Licensing (Scotland) Act 2010 (Commencement No. 11 and Saving Provision) Order 2013 (S.S.I. 2013 No. 214 (C. 15))
 The Vulnerable Witnesses (Giving evidence in relation to the determination of Children's Hearing grounds: Authentication of Prior Statements) (Scotland) Regulations 2013 (S.S.I. 2013 No. 215)
 The Sexual Offences Act 2003 (Notification Requirements) (Scotland) Regulations 2013 (S.S.I. 2013 No. 216)
 The Contaminants in Food (Scotland) Regulations 2013 (S.S.I. 2013 No. 217)
 The Council Tax Reduction (Scotland) Amendment (No. 2) Regulations 2013 (S.S.I. 2013 No. 218)
 The Mobile Homes Act 1983 (Amendment of Schedule 1) (Scotland) Order 2013 (S.S.I. 2013 No. 219)
 The Public Services Reform (Functions of the Common Services Agency for the Scottish Health Service) (Scotland) Order 2013 (S.S.I. 2013 No. 220)
 The Specified Products from China (Restriction on First Placing on the Market) (Scotland) Amendment Regulations 2013 (S.S.I. 2013 No. 221)
 The Landfill (Scotland) Amendment Regulations 2013 (S.S.I. 2013 No. 222)
 The A83 Trunk Road (Poltalloch Street, Lochgilphead) (Temporary Prohibition On Use of Road) Order 2013 (S.S.I. 2013 No. 223)
 The M90/A90 Trunk Road (Gairneybridge to Milnathort) (Temporary 50 mph and 30 mph Speed Restrictions) Order 2013 (S.S.I. 2013 No. 224)
 The Debt Arrangement Scheme (Scotland) Amendment Regulations 2013 (S.S.I. 2013 No. 225)
 The Glasgow City Council Shawfield Dalmarnock Smartbridge Public Road Scheme 2013 Confirmation Instrument 2013 (S.S.I. 2013 No. 226)
 The Registration of Social Workers and Social Service Workers in Care Services (Scotland) Regulations 2013 (S.S.I. 2013 No. 227)
 The Football Banning Orders (Regulated Football Matches) (Scotland) Order 2013 (S.S.I. 2013 No. 228)
 The Sports Grounds and Sporting Events (Designation) (Scotland) Amendment (No. 2) Order 2013 (S.S.I. 2013 No. 229)
 The Highland Council Rum Harbour Revision (Transfer) Order 2013 (S.S.I. 2013 No. 230)
 The A738 Trunk Road (Kilwinning) (Temporary Prohibition on Waiting and Use of Road) Order 2013 (S.S.I. 2013 No. 231)
 The South West Scotland Trunk Roads (Temporary Prohibitions of Traffic and Overtaking and Temporary Speed Restrictions) (No. 7) Order 2013 (S.S.I. 2013 No. 232)
 The South East Scotland Trunk Roads (Temporary Prohibitions of Traffic and Overtaking and Temporary Speed Restrictions) (No. 7) Order 2013 (S.S.I. 2013 No. 233)
 The North West Scotland Trunk Roads (Temporary Prohibitions of Traffic and Overtaking and Temporary Speed Restrictions) (No. 7) Order 2013 (S.S.I. 2013 No. 234)
 The North East Scotland Trunk Roads (Temporary Prohibitions of Traffic and Overtaking and Temporary Speed Restrictions) (No. 7) Order 2013 (S.S.I. 2013 No. 235)
 Act of Sederunt (Registration Appeal Court) 2013 (S.S.I. 2013 No. 236)
 The A7 Trunk Road (High Street and Townhead, Langholm) (Temporary Prohibition On Use of Road) Order 2013 (S.S.I. 2013 No. 237)
 Act of Sederunt (Rules of the Court of Session Amendment No. 5) (Miscellaneous) 2013 (S.S.I. 2013 No. 238)
 The Council Tax Reduction (Scotland) Amendment (No. 3) Regulations 2013 (S.S.I. 2013 No. 239)
 The A85 Trunk Road (Perth Road/East High Street/High Street, Crieff) (Highland Gathering) (Temporary Prohibition On Use of Road) Order 2013 (S.S.I. 2013 No. 240)
 Act of Sederunt (Summary Applications, Statutory Applications and Appeals etc. Rules Amendment) (Policing and Crime Act 2009) 2013 (S.S.I. 2013 No. 241)
 The A85 Trunk Road (Perth Road/East High Street/High Street, Crieff) (Pipe Band Championship) (Temporary Prohibition On Use of Road) Order 2013 (S.S.I. 2013 No. 242)
 The South West Scotland Trunk Roads (Temporary Prohibitions of Traffic and Overtaking and Temporary Speed Restrictions) (No. 8) Order 2013 (S.S.I. 2013 No. 243)
 The South East Scotland Trunk Roads (Temporary Prohibitions of Traffic and Overtaking and Temporary Speed Restrictions) (No. 8) Order 2013 (S.S.I. 2013 No. 244)
 The North West Scotland Trunk Roads (Temporary Prohibitions of Traffic and Overtaking and Temporary Speed Restrictions) (No. 8) Order 2013 (S.S.I. 2013 No. 245)
 The North East Scotland Trunk Roads (Temporary Prohibitions of Traffic and Overtaking and Temporary Speed Restrictions) (No. 8) Order 2013 (S.S.I. 2013 No. 246)
 The Civil Contingencies Act 2004 (Contingency Planning) (Scotland) Amendment Regulations 2013 (S.S.I. 2013 No. 247)
 The M898/A898 Trunk Road (Erskine Bridge) (Temporary Prohibition of Traffic and 40 mph Speed Restriction) (No. 2) Order 2013 (S.S.I. 2013 No. 248)
 The Aquaculture and Fisheries (Scotland) Act 2013 (Commencement and Transitional Provisions) Order 2013 (S.S.I. 2013 No. 249 (C. 16))
 The Legal Aid and Advice and Assistance (Photocopying Fees and Welfare Reform) (Miscellaneous Amendments) (Scotland) Regulations 2013 (S.S.I. 2013 No. 250)
 The A92 Trunk Road (Leuchars) (Temporary 30 mph Speed Restriction) Order 2013 (S.S.I. 2013 No. 251)
 The Water Environment and Water Services (Scotland) Act 2003 (Commencement No. 9) Order 2013 (S.S.I. 2013 No. 252 (C. 17))
 The Home Energy Assistance Scheme (Scotland) Amendment Regulations 2013 (S.S.I. 2013 No. 253)
 The Marine Navigation Act 2013 (Commencement) (Scotland) Order 2013 (S.S.I. 2013 No. 254 (C. 18))
 The A85 Trunk Road (Crieff) (Temporary Prohibition on Waiting, Loading and Unloading) Order 2013 (S.S.I. 2013 No. 255)
 The Fish Labelling (Scotland) Regulations 2013 (S.S.I. 2013 No. 256)
 The A85 Trunk Road (Comrie) (Temporary Prohibition on Waiting, Loading and Unloading) Order 2013 (S.S.I. 2013 No. 257)
 The Glasgow Commonwealth Games (Enforcement Officers) Regulations 2013 (S.S.I. 2013 No. 258)
 The Glasgow Commonwealth Games (Games Locations) Order 2013 (S.S.I. 2013 No. 259)
 The Glasgow Commonwealth Games Act 2008 (Commencement No. 4) Order 2013 (S.S.I. 2013 No. 260 (C. 19))
 The Personal Licence (Training) (Scotland) Regulations 2013 (S.S.I. 2013 No. 261)
 The Scottish Civil Justice Council and Criminal Legal Assistance Act 2013 (Commencement No. 2) Order 2013 (S.S.I. 2013 No. 262 (C. 20))
 The A7 Trunk Road (Lindean Mill Junction to the B6360 Abbotsford House Junction) (Temporary 30 mph Speed Restriction) Order 2013 (S.S.I. 2013 No. 263)
 The Overhead Lines (Exemption) (Scotland) Regulations 2013 (S.S.I. 2013 No. 264)
 The Common Agricultural Policy Single Farm Payment and Support Schemes (Scotland) Amendment Regulations 2013 (S.S.I. 2013 No. 265)
 The Food Additives, Flavourings, Enzymes and Extraction Solvents (Scotland) Regulations 2013 (S.S.I. 2013 No. 266)
 The Angus College (Transfer and Closure) (Scotland) Order 2013 (S.S.I. 2013 No. 267)
 The Banff and Buchan College of Further Education (Transfer and Closure) (Scotland) Order 2013 (S.S.I. 2013 No. 268)
 The Cumbernauld College (Transfer and Closure) (Scotland) Order 2013 (S.S.I. 2013 No. 269)
 The John Wheatley College and Stow College (Transfer and Closure) (Scotland) Order 2013 (S.S.I. 2013 No. 270)
 The Scottish Civil Justice Council and Criminal Legal Assistance Act 2013 (Commencement No. 2) Amendment Order 2013 (S.S.I. 2013 No. 271 (C. 21))
 The South West Scotland Trunk Roads (Temporary Prohibitions of Traffic and Overtaking and Temporary Speed Restrictions) (No. 9) Order 2013 (S.S.I. 2013 No. 272)
 The South East Scotland Trunk Roads (Temporary Prohibitions of Traffic and Overtaking and Temporary Speed Restrictions) (No. 9) Order 2013 (S.S.I. 2013 No. 273)
 The North West Scotland Trunk Roads (Temporary Prohibitions of Traffic and Overtaking and Temporary Speed Restrictions) (No. 9) Order 2013  (S.S.I. 2013 No. 274)
 The North East Scotland Trunk Roads (Temporary Prohibitions of Traffic and Overtaking and Temporary Speed Restrictions) (No. 9) Order 2013 (S.S.I. 2013 No. 275)
The Marine (Scotland) Act 2010 (Commencement No. 3 and Consequential Provisions) Order 2013 (S.S.I. 2013 No. 276 (C. 22))
The Town and Country Planning (Marine Fish Farming) (Scotland) Regulations 2013 (S.S.I. 2013 No. 277)
(S.S.I. 2013 No. 277)
 The Freedom of Information (Scotland) Act 2002 (Designation of Persons as Scottish Public Authorities) Order 2013 (S.S.I. 2013 No. 278)
 The Bee Keeping (Colonsay and Oronsay) Order 2013 (S.S.I. 2013 No. 279)
 The Loch Sligachan, Isle of Skye, Scallops Several Fishery Order 2013 (S.S.I. 2013 No. 280)
The Post-16 Education (Scotland) Act 2013 (Commencement No. 1) Order 2013 (S.S.I. 2013 No. 281 (C. 23))
The Public Contracts (Scotland) Amendment Regulations 2013 (S.S.I. 2013 No. 282)
The A82 Trunk Road (Dumbarton) (40mph Speed Limit) Variation Order 2013 (S.S.I. 2013 No. 283)
The A92/A972 Trunk Road (Balfarg Junction) (Temporary Prohibition of Specified Turns) Order 2013 (S.S.I. 2013 No. 284)
The A6091/A7 Trunk Road (Buccleuch Road and Buccleuch Street, Hawick) (Temporary Prohibition on Waiting, Loading and Unloading) Order 2013 (S.S.I. 2013 No. 285)
The Marine Licensing (Pre-application Consultation) (Scotland) Regulations 2013 (S.S.I. 2013 No. 286)
The Council Tax Reduction (Scotland) Amendment (No. 4) Regulations 2013 (S.S.I. 2013 No. 287)
The Rosyth International Container Terminal (Harbour Revision) Order 2013 (S.S.I. 2013 No. 288)
The Title Conditions (Scotland) Act 2003 (Conservation Bodies) Amendment Order 2013 (S.S.I. 2013 No. 289)
The Glasgow Commonwealth Games (Trading and Advertising) (Scotland) Regulations 2013 (S.S.I. 2013 No. 290)
Act of Sederunt (Commissary Business) 2013 (S.S.I. 2013 No. 291)
The National Health Service (Cross-Border Health Care) (Scotland) Regulations 2013 (S.S.I. 2013 No. 292)
Act of Sederunt (Summary Applications, Statutory Applications and Appeals etc. Rules Amendment) (Miscellaneous) 2013 (S.S.I. 2013 No. 293)
Act of Sederunt (Rules of the Court of Session Amendment No. 6) (Miscellaneous) 2013 (S.S.I. 2013 No. 294)
The A96 Trunk Road (Inveramsay Bridge Improvement) (Trunking and Detrunking) Order 2013 (S.S.I. 2013 No. 295)
The A96 Trunk Road (Inveramsay Bridge Improvement) (Side Roads) Order 2013 (S.S.I. 2013 No. 296)
The A9 Trunk Road (Ballinluig) (Temporary Prohibition of Specified Turns) Order 2013 (S.S.I. 2013 No. 297)
The South West Scotland Trunk Roads (Temporary Prohibitions of Traffic and Overtaking and Temporary Speed Restrictions) (No. 10) Order 2013 (S.S.I. 2013 No. 298)
The North East Scotland Trunk Roads (Temporary Prohibitions of Traffic and Overtaking and Temporary Speed Restrictions) (No. 10) Order 2013 (S.S.I. 2013 No. 299)
The North West Scotland Trunk Roads (Temporary Prohibitions of Traffic and Overtaking and Temporary Speed Restrictions) (No. 10) Order 2013 (S.S.I. 2013 No. 300)

301-400 
 The South East Scotland Trunk Roads (Temporary Prohibitions of Traffic and Overtaking and Temporary Speed Restrictions) (No. 10) Order 2013 (S.S.I. 2013 No. 301)
 The Drugs Courts (Scotland) Amendment Order 2013 (S.S.I. 2013 No. 302)
 The Growth and Infrastructure Act 2013 (Commencement) (Scotland) Order 2013 (S.S.I. 2013 No. 303 (C. 24))
 The Electricity Generating Stations (Applications for Variation of Consent) (Scotland) Regulations 2013 (S.S.I. 2013 No. 304)
The Fruit Juices and Fruit Nectars (Scotland) Regulations 2013 (S.S.I. 2013 No. 305)
 The A96 Trunk Road (Church Road, Keith) (Temporary Prohibition On Use of Road) Order 2013 (S.S.I. 2013 No. 306)
 The Animal By-Products (Enforcement) (Scotland) Regulations 2013 (S.S.I. 2013 No. 307)
The Whitehills Harbour and Marina (Constitution) Order 2013  (S.S.I. 2013 No. 308)
The Rural Development Contracts (Land Managers Options) (Scotland) Amendment Regulations 2013 (revoked) (S.S.I. 2013 No. 309)
 The Adoption (Recognition of Overseas Adoptions) (Scotland) Regulations 2013 (S.S.I. 2013 No. 310)
 The Road Traffic (Permitted Parking Area and Special Parking Area) (East Dunbartonshire Council) Designation Order 2013  (S.S.I. 2013 No. 311)
 The Road Traffic (Parking Adjudicators) (East Dunbartonshire Council) Regulations 2013 (S.S.I. 2013 No. 312)
The Parking Attendants (Wearing of Uniforms) (East Dunbartonshire Council Parking Area) Regulations 2013 (S.S.I. 2013 No. 313)
The Flood Risk Management (Designated Responsible Authorities) (Scotland) Order 2013 (S.S.I. 2013 No. 314)
The Litter (Fixed Penalties) (Scotland) Order 2013 (S.S.I. 2013 No. 315)
The M90/A90 Trunk Road (Great Western Road) (Temporary Prohibition of Specified Turn) Order 2013 (S.S.I. 2013 No. 316)
Act of Sederunt (Rules of the Court of Session Amendment No. 7) (Miscellaneous) 2013 (S.S.I. 2013 No. 317)
The Protected Trust Deeds (Scotland) Regulations 2013 (S.S.I. 2013 No. 318)
The Fundable Bodies (Scotland) Order 2013 (S.S.I. 2013 No. 319)
 The Criminal Legal Aid (Scotland) (Fees) Amendment Regulations 2013 (S.S.I. 2013 No. 320)
 The Pollution Prevention and Control (Designation of Energy Efficiency Directive) (Scotland) Order 2013 (revoked) (S.S.I. 2013 No. 321)
The Long Leases (Scotland) Act 2012 (Commencement No. 1) Order 2013 (S.S.I. 2013 No. 322 (C. 25))
The Water Environment (River Basin Management Planning: Further Provision) (Scotland) Regulations 2013 (S.S.I. 2013 No. 323)
The Water Environment (Shellfish Water Protected Areas: Designation) (Scotland) Order 2013 (S.S.I. 2013 No. 324)
The Water Environment (Shellfish Water Protected Areas: Environmental Objectives etc.) (Scotland) Regulations 2013 (S.S.I. 2013 No. 325)
 The Seed (Scotland) (Miscellaneous Amendments) Regulations 2013 (S.S.I. 2013 No. 326)
 The National Health Service (Travelling Expenses and Remission of Charges) (Scotland) (No. 2) Amendment Regulations 2013 (S.S.I. 2013 No. 327)
The Budget (Scotland) Act 2013 Amendment Order 2013 (S.S.I. 2013 No. 328)
The South West Scotland Trunk Roads (Temporary Prohibitions of Traffic and Overtaking and Temporary Speed Restrictions) (No. 11) Order 2013 (S.S.I. 2013 No. 329)
The South East Scotland Trunk Roads (Temporary Prohibitions of Traffic and Overtaking and Temporary Speed Restrictions) (No. 11) Order 2013 (S.S.I. 2013 No. 330)
The North West Scotland Trunk Roads (Temporary Prohibitions of Traffic and Overtaking and Temporary Speed Restrictions) (No. 11) Order 2013 (S.S.I. 2013 No. 331)
The North East Scotland Trunk Roads (Temporary Prohibitions of Traffic and Overtaking and Temporary Speed Restrictions) (No. 11) Order 2013 (S.S.I. 2013 No. 332)
The Food Safety, Food Hygiene and Official Controls (Sprouting Seeds) (Scotland) Regulations 2013 (S.S.I. 2013 No. 333)
The Health Boards (Membership) (Scotland) Regulations 2013 (S.S.I. 2013 No. 334)
The Adoption (Recognition of Overseas Adoptions) (Scotland) Amendment Regulations 2013 (S.S.I. 2013 No. 335)
The Food (Miscellaneous Amendments) (Scotland) Regulations 2013 (S.S.I. 2013 No. 336)
The Bovine Viral Diarrhoea (Scotland) Amendment (No. 2) Order 2013 (S.S.I. 2013 No. 337)
The A77 Trunk Road (Dalrymple Street Girvan) (Temporary Prohibition On Use of Road) Order 2013 (S.S.I. 2013 No. 338)
The Defamation Act 2013 (Commencement) (Scotland) Order 2013 (S.S.I. 2013 No. 339 (C. 26))
The Feed (Hygiene and Enforcement) and Animal Feed (Scotland) Amendment Regulations 2013 (S.S.I. 2013 No. 340)
The Sexual Offences (Scotland) Act 2009 (Commencement No. 2) Order 2013 (S.S.I. 2013 No. 341 (C. 27))
The Water Resources (Scotland) Act 2013 (Commencement No. 2) Order 2013 (S.S.I. 2013 No. 342 (C. 28))
The A9 Trunk Road (Blair Atholl Junction) (Temporary Prohibition on Use of Road) Order 2013 (S.S.I. 2013 No. 343)
The A96 Trunk Road (Inverurie Road/Auchmill Road/Great Northern Road) (Redetermination of Means of Exercise of Public Right of Passage) Order 2013 (S.S.I. 2013 No. 344)
Act of Sederunt (Fees of Sheriff Officers) 2013 (S.S.I. 2013 No. 345)
Act of Sederunt (Fees of Messengers-at-Arms) 2013 (S.S.I. 2013 No. 346)
The National Health Service (Variation of Areas of Health Boards) (Scotland) Order 2013 (S.S.I. 2013 No. 347)
The Post-16 Education (Scotland) Act 2013 (Commencement No. 2) Order 2013 (S.S.I. 2013 No. 348 (C. 29))
The Environmental Protection (Restriction on Use of Lead Shot) (Scotland) Amendment Regulations 2013 (S.S.I. 2013 No. 349)
The Town and Country Planning (Prescribed Date) (Scotland) Regulations 2013 (S.S.I. 2013 No. 350)
The Local Governance (Scotland) Act 2004 (Remuneration) Amendment Regulations 2013 (S.S.I. 2013 No. 351)
The A702 Trunk Road (Biggar High Street) (Temporary Prohibition On Use of Road) Order 2013 (S.S.I. 2013 No. 352)
The A85 Trunk Road (Comrie) (Temporary Prohibition On Use of Road) Order 2013 (S.S.I. 2013 No. 353)
The Colleges of Further Education (Transfer and Closure) (Scotland) Order 2013 (S.S.I. 2013 No. 354)
The National Health Service (General Ophthalmic Services) (Scotland) Amendment Regulations 2013 (S.S.I. 2013 No. 355)
The Land Reform (Scotland) Act 2003 (Modification) Order 2013 (S.S.I. 2013 No. 356)
The Register of Young Voters (Anonymous Entries) (Scotland) Order 2013 (S.S.I. 2013 No. 357)
The North East Scotland Trunk Roads (Temporary Prohibitions of Traffic and Overtaking and Temporary Speed Restrictions) (No. 12) Order 2013 (S.S.I. 2013 No. 358)
The South West Scotland Trunk Roads (Temporary Prohibitions of Traffic and Overtaking and Temporary Speed Restrictions) (No. 12) Order 2013 (S.S.I. 2013 No. 359)
The South East Scotland Trunk Roads (Temporary Prohibitions of Traffic and Overtaking and Temporary Speed Restrictions) (No. 12) Order 2013 (S.S.I. 2013 No. 360)
The North West Scotland Trunk Roads (Temporary Prohibitions of Traffic and Overtaking and Temporary Speed Restrictions) (No. 12) Order 2013 (S.S.I. 2013 No. 361) 
The Scottish Charitable Incorporated Organisations (Removal from Register and Dissolution) Amendment Regulations 2013 (S.S.I. 2013 No. 362)
The Bovine Viral Diarrhoea (Scotland) Amendment (No. 3) Order 2013 (S.S.I. 2013 No. 363)
The Health Boards (Membership and Elections) (Scotland) Order 2013 (S.S.I. 2013 No. 364)
The Freedom of Information (Scotland) Act 2002 (Historical Periods) Order 2013 (S.S.I. 2013 No. 365)
The Plant Health (Scotland) Amendment (No. 3) Order 2013 (revoked) (S.S.I. 2013 No. 366)

References 

2013
Statutory Instruments
Scotland Statutory Instruments